The 2012 Dow Corning Tennis Classic was a professional tennis tournament played on hard courts. It was the eighteenth edition of the tournament which was part of the 2012 ITF Women's Circuit. It took place in Midland, United States, on January 6–12, 2012, offering $100,000 in prize money.

WTA entrants

Seeds 

 1 Rankings as of January 30, 2012

Other entrants 
The following players received wildcards into the singles main draw:
  Julia Boserup
  Anne-Liz Jeukeng
  Alessondra Parra

The following players received entry from the qualifying draw:
  Madison Keys
  Samantha Murray
  Jessica Pegula
  Shelby Rogers

The following players received entry as lucky losers:
  Yana Buchina
  Federica Grazioso
  Lindsay Lee-Waters

The following players received entry through special exempt:
  Darya Kustova

Champions

Singles 

  Olga Govortsova def.  Magdaléna Rybáriková 6–3, 6–7(6–8), 7–6(7–5)

Doubles 

  Andrea Hlaváčková /  Lucie Hradecká def.  Vesna Dolonts /  Stéphanie Foretz Gacon 7–6(7–4), 6–2

References 
 Official website
 2012 Dow Corning Tennis Classic at ITFtennis.com

Dow Corning Tennis Classic
Dow Corning Tennis Classic
2012 in sports in Michigan
2012 in American tennis